Ngawun is an extinct Mayi language once spoken on the Cape York Peninsula of Queensland, Australia, by the Wunumara and Ngawun peoples. The last speaker of the language was Cherry O'Keefe (or Tjapun in the language) who died of pneumonia on 24 August 1977.

The etymology of the name Ngawun is unknown.

Wanamarra (also known as Maykulan and Wunumura) was spoken in North West Queensland. The language region includes areas within the Shire of McKinlay, Shire of Cloncurry and Shire of Richmond, including the Flinders River area, and the towns of Kynuna and Richmond.

References 

Mayabic languages
Extinct languages of Queensland